Mark Turner (born 14 April 1960) is a former Australian rules footballer who played with Hawthorn in the Victorian Football League (VFL).

Turner, a recruit from St Leo's College, made 35 appearances for Hawthorn, between 1979 and 1983. He then played in the Victorian Football Association (VFA), first at Camberwell, followed by a stint with Box Hill. In the 1986 VFA Second Division Grand Final, Turner was on a half back flank for Box Hill, in an 18-point win over Sunshine, to claim the premiership. He was playing coach of the Wodonga Raiders from 1989 to 1992, the club's first four seasons in the Ovens & Murray Football League.

References

1960 births
Australian rules footballers from Victoria (Australia)
Hawthorn Football Club players
Camberwell Football Club players
Box Hill Football Club players
Wodonga Raiders Football Club players
Wodonga Raiders Football Club coaches
Living people